Mark Klempner (July 11, 1956 – March 3, 2019) was a folklorist, oral historian and social commentator.

Early life
Klempner grew up in New York City, and attended Cornell University, graduating Phi Beta Kappa in 1997, and winning a J. William Fulbright Fellowship. In 2000, he received an M.A. in folklore from the University of North Carolina at Chapel Hill.

Later in life, he moved to Costa Rica and taught English writing in Blue Valley school.

Music
Mark worked at the Bodhi Tree Bookstore in Los Angeles and taught guitar to private clients.

Mark began performing at local coffee houses and quickly gained a following, especially from people he knew from the Bodhi Tree.

In 1985, he released his first music on tape called « Secrets of the heart » the title song was written as a mini-biography mentioning his cat, Krishna, and her two kittens, Pablo and Gertrude (who were given as a gift to one of his guitar students as a graduation gift).
Around this time, he began performing under the stage name of Jamie Michaels.

Around 1990, Mark released his second album, written mostly about his life.

Both albums were recorded in the living room of his home on Berendo St. in Los Angeles with a 4 track studio recorder.

The Heart Has Reasons
Klempner spent nearly a decade talking with and getting to know Dutch Righteous Among the Nations in order to write The Heart Has Reasons: Holocaust Rescuers and Their Stories of Courage, Cleveland: The Pilgrim Press, 2006.  He found the rescuers through Yad Vashem, and was originally funded by a research grant from the Institute for European Studies at Cornell University. Most of the rescuers he interviewed were previously unknown to the general public, with the exception of Miep Gies, who tried to save Anne Frank and her family. Because Klempner is the son of a Jewish immigrant who barely escaped the Holocaust, he found that his subjects sometimes looked at him as the child or grandchild of the Jews they rescued. He later conducted archival research at The United States Holocaust Memorial Museum and The Netherlands Institute for War Documentation. The published book contains a foreword by renowned Holocaust historian Christopher Browning. In Spring of 2012, Klempner addressed members of the United States Congress and their Staffs on the occasion of Holocaust Remembrance Day (Yom HaShoah). He also spoke at the Library of Congress and a webcast is now available containing his speech.

The subtitle has changed from "Holocaust Rescuers and Their Stories of Courage" to "Dutch Rescuers of Jewish Children during the Holocaust." The author notes that this second edition contains 12 new photographs, improvements in the text, and an updated epilogue.

Historical, social, political, and cultural commentary
Klempner's articles on oral history methodology have appeared internationally in professional journals and anthologies such as The Oral History Reader.  He has also been a guest columnist for mainstream periodicals such as the Christian Science Monitor and the Baltimore Sun as well as progressive religious periodicals like the  National Catholic Reporter and Tikkun.  His op-eds often tackle difficult political and social issues, such as his piece "The Internet: Our Last Hope for a Free Press," which has received more than 1,000 Diggs.  He has also been featured as a radio commentator on Morning Edition, and has been interviewed on Air America Radio, NPR, Prime Time Radio and other broadcast media in the United States. He has also been an interviewer, most notably of author Tracy Kidder, who spoke with Klempner about his portrait of Dr. Paul Farmer found in the book Mountains Beyond Mountains. Klempner's articles have appeared on the internet at such sites as Common Dreams, Alternet, The Huffington Post, The Social Edge and Sojo Mail, the weekly newsletter of Jim Wallis' Sojourners community.

Death
Mark enjoyed the outdoors and went on nature walks and hiking often, sometimes alone.
He was reported missing by friends of his, and after a search his body was found and later recovered.

There is some speculation on the events of his death, but it is believed that he slipped on a narrow part of the trail and fell many feet.

See also
List of people who assisted Jews during the Holocaust
Righteous Among the Nations
List of Righteous Among the Nations by country
Yad Vashem
Miep Gies
Anne Frank

References

External links
Interview by Mark Klempner: "A Conversation With Tracy Kidder About 'Mountains Beyond Mountains'"
Tales of Courage Changed His Life (article on Klempner from the Raleigh News & Observer)
Navigating Life Review Interviews with Survivors of Trauma, Oral History Review, Summer/Fall 2000 issue
Forgiveness and Hope in the China Cabinet, National Catholic Reporter, May 7, 2004
"Time for new Marshall Plan to rebuild, heal world", The Baltimore Sun, April 11, 2007
"Don't let technology take over", The Christian Science Monitor, June 25, 2007
"The Internet: Our Last Hope for a Free Press", Commondreams.org, September 28, 2007

1956 births
21st-century American historians
21st-century American male writers
Oral historians
Jewish American writers
American columnists
American male journalists
American religious writers
Cornell University alumni
2019 deaths
University of North Carolina at Chapel Hill alumni
American male non-fiction writers
21st-century American Jews
Fulbright alumni